Ezequiel Damián Carballo (born 10 November 1989) is an Argentine footballer. He plays as a striker.

Career
After a spell in 2020 at 9 de Julio Olímpico in Freyre, Argentina, Carballo returned to Italy where he joined Calcio Montebelluna 1909 in March 2020. In July 2020, Carballo moved to another Italian club, A.S.D. Albenga 1928.

References

External links
 Profile at BDFA 
 
 Ezequiel Carballo at Tuttocampo

1989 births
Living people
Argentine footballers
Argentine expatriate footballers
Association football forwards
Ferro Carril Oeste footballers
Unión San Felipe footballers
Central Español players
9 de Julio de Morteros players
Gimnasia y Tiro footballers
Unión de Sunchales footballers
Albissola 2010 players
Chilean Primera División players
Serie D players
Argentine expatriate sportspeople in Chile
Argentine expatriate sportspeople in Uruguay
Argentine expatriate sportspeople in Italy
Expatriate footballers in Chile
Expatriate footballers in Uruguay
Expatriate footballers in Italy